John Bennett (born 15 May 1949) is an English former footballer who played as a winger.

Career
Bennett began his career at Rotherham United, playing for the club as an apprentice. Bennett made his only first team appearance for the club in the  1965–1966 Second Division. After leaving Rotherham, Bennett joined Chelmsford City.

References

1949 births
Living people
Association football wingers
English footballers
Footballers from Rotherham
Rotherham United F.C. players
Chelmsford City F.C. players
English Football League players